The Aerosur Cup was a Bolivian football tournament held in the La Paz, Cochabamba and Santa Cruz, sponsored by Aerosur airline. The original idea was to make AeroSur Cup a tournament for the winning teams from previous seasons in the whole country of (Bolivia), this idea changed. Later on, the Cup became a tournament between the 6 best teams of the main cities: Wilstermann, Oriente Petrolero, Blooming, The Strongest and Bolivar, and Aurora. In 2008 the tournament was split in two competition:Copa Aerosur and Copa Aerosur del Sur. The AeroSur Cup from the south was created due to the requests from several South teams that are not taken into account in the Original Cup. The most important protagonists of the cup are: La Paz FC (Runners-up in 2 tournaments in 2008), Real Potosi (2007 Apertura champions), Universitario (2008 Apertura Champions), San Jose (1995 Liga and 2007 Apertura Champions), which can’t be considered small teams, as they have won 3 of the last 9 tournaments played in the Major League of Bolivian Soccer. 

Aerosur Champion Cup and the Aerosur Cup from the south have become important because they are considered the most eagerly awaited cup by the country's soccer fans, not only because they are the first two tournaments that open the season, but also because the expectations to see new players and reinforcements hired by each team.

List of Championship

Copa Aerosur

Copa Aerosur del Sur

Results by team (Copa Aerosur)

Results by team (Copa Aerosur del Sur)

 
Aerosur
Bolivia
Recurring sporting events established in 2003
2003 establishments in Bolivia